Robert Dalrymple (born 10 August 1971) is a South African cricketer. He played in fourteen first-class and four List A matches for Boland from 1992/93 to 1994/95.

See also
 List of Boland representative cricketers

References

External links
 

1971 births
Living people
South African cricketers
Boland cricketers
Cricketers from Cape Town